is a high island in the Sea of Japan off the coast of Hokkaido, Japan. Administratively the island is part of Hokkaido Prefecture, and is divided between two towns, Rishiri and Rishirifuji. The island is formed by the cone-shaped extinct volcanic peak of Mount Rishiri. Along with Rebun Island and the coastal area of the Sarobetsu Plain, Rishiri forms the Rishiri-Rebun-Sarobetsu National Park. The main industries of Rishiri are tourism and fishing. The island has a population of 5,102 residents.

Etymology
Rishiri derives its name from the Ainu language, and means "high island", or "island with a high peak", a reference to the altitude of Mount Rishiri above sea level.

Geography
The residents of Rishiri live in coastal communities, which are connected by a bus service that circumnavigates the island.

Important Bird Area
The island has been recognised as an Important Bird Area (IBA) by BirdLife International because it supports populations of black-tailed gulls and Japanese robins.

Climate

Communities
The island is divided between two towns, Rishiri (population 2,304), on the south-west half of island and Rishirifuji (population 2,798) on the north-east half of island, both which belong to Rishiri District, Sōya Subprefecture.

These towns include the following communities, listed from the north side of the island, clockwise around:

Transportation
 Ferry service to Rebun, Wakkanai, and Otaru
 Air link to Wakkanai

A bus runs the circuit route around the island.

Rishiri Airport is located in Rishirifuji.

History
 1807-1808 Failed military expedition to Sakhalin, part of deceased buried at cape Peshi.
 Ranald MacDonald (1824-1894), first native English teacher in Japan, landed on Rishiri in 1848.
 On February 7, 2013, Russian Sukhoi Su-27 fighter jets had been spotted above Japanese waters off Rishiri Island, and were pursued by four Mitsubishi F-2s.

Economy

The economy of Rishiri Island formerly depended on the fishing of Pacific herring, but the herring stock is now mostly depleted. Rishiri Island is now noted for its production of dried kombu.

Noted features
 Pon-yama - a mountain top near north coast, nearby a site of non-coastal hiking camp on island
Other features of Rishiri Island include:
 Cape Peshi on the East side of the port Oshidomari
 Cape Senhoshi
 Neguma (Sleeping Bear) Rock
 Jimmen Rock
 Ponmoshiri Island
 Hime Marsh
 Menūshoro Marsh
 Otatomari Marsh

See also 
 List of islands of Japan

References

External links

Islands of the Sea of Japan
Islands of Hokkaido
Important Bird Areas of Japan